Clostridium disporicum is a Gram-positive, rod-shaped and anaerobic bacterium from the genus Clostridium which has been isolated from the caecum of a rat in England.

References

Further reading
 

 

Bacteria described in 1987
disporicum